The 2001 Southern Conference men's basketball tournament took place from March 1–4, 2001 at the BI-LO Center in Greenville, South Carolina. The UNC Greensboro Spartans won their first title as a member of the Southern Conference and received the automatic berth to the 2001 NCAA tournament.

Format
All twelve teams were eligible for the tournament. The tournament used a preset bracket consisting of four rounds, the first of which featured four games, with the winners moving on to the quarterfinal round. The top two finishers in each division received first round byes.

Bracket

* Overtime game

See also
List of Southern Conference men's basketball champions

References

Tournament
Southern Conference men's basketball tournament
Southern Conference men's basketball tournament
Southern Conference men's basketball tournament